Souls on Ice is the third and final studio album by American rapper Seagram. It was released posthumously on August 12, 1997, by Rap-A-Lot/Noo Trybe Records, a year after Seagram's passing. Seagram was murdered by gunfire on July 31, 1996, while shielding his long-time friend Gangsta P.

The album was produced by Mike Dean, Terry T and Tone Capone. It peaked at number 66 on the Billboard Top R&B/Hip-Hop Albums and at number 40 on the Billboard Top Heatseekers. The album features guest appearances by Spice 1, Yukmouth and Scarface.

Along with a single, a music video was produced for the song, "If the World Was Mine", although Seagram only appears briefly in it. The song "Sleepin In My Nikes" also appeared on the 1998 Scarface album My Homies.

Critical reception 
Rap Pages (8/97, p. 102) – "...Souls on Ice gives uncompromising insight on the conditions of growing up poor in urban America and the activities some use as methods and means of survival..."

The Source (9/97, p. 216) – "...Seagram reveals what made him different from most gangsta rappers....[His] gritty tales of the East O streets are hard to ignore...Making it the second best Rap CD of all time"

Vibe (10/97, p. 174) – "The rapper's passion for his music is clear.... Hopefully, some of us will learn from the painful poetry of yet another life cut way too short..."

Track listing 
 "Sleepin In My Nikes" (featuring Scarface) – 4:27
 "S.E.A.G." – 3:51
 "Slingin The Yea" – 4:58
 "If the World Was Mine" – 4:15
 "Don't Stop" (featuring Spice 1) – 3:47
 "Off the Hook" – 4:25
 "One 2 the Two" – 4:10
 "Like This Like That" – 4:09
 "Flintstones" – 4:50
 "S.E.A.G. & Yuk Is Ridin" (featuring Yukmouth) – 4:51
 "Gotta Stay Down" – 4:47
 "Straight Mobbin" – 4:03

Chart history

References

External links 
[ Souls on Ice] at Allmusic
Souls on Ice at Discogs
Souls on Ice at Tower Records

Seagram (rapper) albums
1997 albums
Albums published posthumously
Rap-A-Lot Records albums
Albums produced by Mike Dean (record producer)